Untitled was a serial publication published by the Friends of Photography from 1972 to 1994. A total of 58 numbered publications were issued, first as a small magazine format and later as a series of booklets and full-size books. Numbers 1-10 displayed the series name and issue number on the cover, but as the publications became more specialized each number was titled independently in addition to the series name. The smallest publication in the series was Number 1, with 10 pages, and the largest was Number 43, with 156 pages.

Many of the publications were catalogs of exhibitions held at the Friends of Photography gallery in Carmel, California. The publication featured many famous photographers, including Ansel Adams, Ruth Bernhard, Harry Callahan, Roy DeCarava, Lee Friedlander, Mary Ellen Mark, Aaron Siskind, Paul Strand, Brett Weston, and Edward Weston. It also offered perspectives on newer photographic trends like plastic cameras and the influence of pop art. 
 
Here is a complete list of all 58 publications:

References

Visual arts magazines published in the United States
Defunct magazines published in the United States
Magazines established in 1972
Magazines disestablished in 1994
Photography magazines
Photography in the United States